Air Shares Elite, offered fractional ownership and rental of private high performance aircraft.

History
Air Shares Elite was formed in 1999 providing shares in aircraft that it owned. In 2014, the service terminated and aircraft were sold.

Fleet
The Air Shares Elite offered a fractional ownership of mainly Cirrus SR22 aircraft, with the intent of offering fractional ownership of the Cirrus Vision SF50 Jet.

See also

ImagineAir - Airline operating Cirrus aircraft
NetJets Fractional Jet Ownership

References

Fractional aircraft ownership companies